The Saburtalo Pantheon is a burial site in Tbilisi, Georgia, where some of the most prominent scientists and cultural activities are buried. It was opened in the 1970s. It consists of old (closed) and new (opened in 2002) pantheons.

Notable burials 
 Leila Abashidze
 Kakhi Asatiani
 Giorgi Dzotsenidze
 Aleksi Inauri
 Ipolite Khvichia
 David Kipiani
 Slava Metreveli
 Boris Paichadze
 Giorgi Sanaia
 Zurab Sotkilava
 Baadur Tsuladze

See also 
 Mtatsminda Pantheon
 Didube Pantheon
 List of cemeteries in Georgia (country)

References

External links
 

Buildings and structures in Tbilisi
Burials in Georgia (country)
Cemeteries in Georgia (country)
1970s establishments in Georgia (country)